Obrimona is a monotypic genus of Asian dwarf spiders containing the single species, Obrimona tennenti. It was first described by Embrik Strand in 1934, and has only been found in Sri Lanka.

See also
 List of Linyphiidae species (I–P)

References

Invertebrates of Sri Lanka
Linyphiidae
Monotypic Araneomorphae genera
Spiders of Asia
Taxa named by Embrik Strand